Juan Rafael Allende (October 24, 1848 – July 20, 1909) was a Chilean dramatist, author and journalist. He was also known to direct and act in his own plays. He is often recognized as the father of humorous press in Chile. Through writing Allende chastised the aristocratic class and defended ideas of egalitarianism and democracy. Above all he is known for challenging the Catholic clergy.

Being a cultural figure, he is related to the oral, popular and country poetry tradition. With this aspects he shares formal characteristics, like revindication of the grotesque and festive.

He also used pseudonyms like El Pequén (The burrowing owl), O.N.E. and El Diablo Azul (The Blue Devil).

Theatrical works

El qué dirán. 1872
El entierr
El Jeneral Daza
José Romero
Moro viejo
Las mujeres de la india
Huérfano!
La República de Jauja
Víctima de su propia lengua
Un drama sin desenlace
El Cabo Ponce
De la taberna al cadalso

Further reading
 Donoso, Ricardo. La sátira política en Chile. Santiago: Imprenta Universitaria, Sociedad de Bibliófilos Chilenos, 1950.
 Salinas, Maximiliano. ¡Ya no hablan de Jesucristo!: las sátiras al alto clero y las mentalidades religiosas en Chile a fines del siglo XIX. Santiago: LOM Ediciones, 2002.
 Salinas, Maximiliano. El que ríe último: caricaturas y poesías en la prensa humorística chilena del siglo XIX. Santiago: Editorial Universitaria, Corporación del Patrimonio Cultural de Chile, Santiago, Centro de Investigaciones Diego Barros Arana, 2001.

External links
 Biography of Allende @ Memoria Chilena

Chilean male dramatists and playwrights
Chilean journalists
Male journalists
Chilean people of Basque descent
1909 deaths
1848 births
Writers from Santiago
19th-century dramatists and playwrights
19th-century male writers